Dennis is an unincorporated community in Murray County, in the U.S. state of Georgia.

History
A post office called Dennis was established in 1882, and remained in operation until 1906. The community was named after Dennis Johnson, a local merchant.

References

Unincorporated communities in Murray County, Georgia
Unincorporated communities in Georgia (U.S. state)